Andrii Bohdanovych Deshchytsia (born 22 September 1965) is a Ukrainian diplomat and politician.

From February to June 2014 Deshchytsia was Acting Foreign minister of Ukraine.

Deshchytsia was from October 2014 to June 2022 Ambassador Extraordinary and Plenipotentiary of Ukraine to Republic of Poland.

Early life and education
Andrii Deshchytsia was born on September 22, 1965, in Spasiv, near Pervyatychi, Lviv Oblast. His father, Bohdan Deshchytsia, worked as a postmaster in Sokal, and in the 1990s held the first rallies for Ukraine here. His mother worked as a paramedic and nurse.

In 1989, he graduated from Ivan Franko Lviv National University.

Then, in 1995, he graduated with a master's degree from the Department of History of the University of Alberta (Edmonton, Alberta, Canada).

Deshchytsia became a Candidate of Political Science after the successful defense of his master's thesis "The Rise of Multi-Party Systems in Poland and Ukraine", written under the supervision of Professor John-Paul Himka.

He is fluent in Ukrainian, English, Russian, and Polish.

Professional career

Early positions
From 1996 to 1999, Andrii Deshchytsia served as press Secretary, First Secretary of the Embassy of Ukraine to the Republic of Poland.

In 1999–2001, he was a Senior Coordinator of PAUCI (Polish-American-Ukrainian Cooperation Initiative).

From 2001 to 2004, he took a position of a counselor of the Embassy of Ukraine to the Republic of Finland and then as Counselor and Minister-Counselor of the Embassy of Ukraine to the Republic of Poland until 2006.

In 2006–2007, Deshchytsia was Spokesperson of the Ministry of Foreign Affairs of Ukraine.

From 2008 to 2012, he served as Ambassador Extraordinary and Plenipotentiary of Ukraine to the Republic of Finland and Iceland, while living in Finland.

From 2012 to February 2014, Andrii Deshchytsia was Ambassador-at-Large. During that time, from January–December 2013, he was Special Representative of OSCE Chairperson-in-Office for Conflict Resolution.

As Ukrainian Foreign Minister

On February 27, 2014, was appointed Acting Minister of Foreign Affairs of Ukraine.

UN Resolution on Territorial integrity of Ukraine 

On March 27, 2014, at the UN General Assembly, Deshchytsia presented the resolution on "Territorial integrity of Ukraine", which was supported by 100 United Nations member states, affirming the United Nations commitment to recognize Crimea within Ukraine's international borders and to condemn Crimea's annexation by Russia as illegal.

Geneva Statement on Ukraine 

On 17 April 2014, Deshchytsia negotiated with John Kerry, Catherine Ashton, and Sergei Lavrov at a quadrilateral meeting in Geneva in an attempt to find a diplomatic solution to the war and humanitarian crisis caused by the Russian aggression in Ukraine. The resulting Geneva Statement on Ukraine laid the ground for de-escalating the crisis. However, Russia has repeatedly breached its commitments under the Geneva agreement, according to official statements of the leaders of the EU and the United States. One week after the joint Geneva Statement, U.S. Secretary of State John Kerry accused Russia of failing to adhere to Geneva commitments by orchestrating armed resistance in eastern Ukraine. U.S. President Barack Obama stated that Vladimir Putin has 'not lifted a finger to ease tensions. President of the European Council Herman Van Rompuy acknowledged that Russia has not lived up to its Geneva commitments.

Advocating sanctions against Russia 
In May 2014, Deshchytsia said: "The West should impose more severe sanctions that hit specific economic sectors such as banking and target Russian decision-makers. Deshchytsia labeled pro-Russian separatists as "terrorists".

Progress in visa-free regime with EU for Ukrainian citizens 
Deshchytsia also said "We expect that the decision (to switch to the 2nd phase of the introduction of a visa-free regime with Ukraine) will be taken at the EU Council's meeting on June 23".

Incident near the Russian Embassy 

On June 14, 2014, protesters had swarmed on the Russian embassy - overturning the embassy car and throwing paint and egg missiles — after pro-Russian combatants shot down a Ukrainian plane, killing 49 on board. Deshchytsia had descended on the protest in the hope that he could quell the escalating trouble, pleading with the demonstrators not to attack the building despite also understanding their concerns. "Did I say that I am against you protesting? I am for you protesting. I am ready to be here with you and say 'Russia, get out of Ukraine'," he told the baying crowd. "Yes, Putin is a khuilo!, yes," he said. However, Geoffrey Pyatt, the US ambassador to Ukraine, wrote on Twitter that the minister had been "seeking to defuse a dangerous situation", adding that Deshchytsia is "a skilled diplomat and credit to Ukraine". On June 19, 2014, with the recent Presidential change, Deschytsia was replaced with Pavlo Klimkin, the former Ukrainian ambassador to Germany.

Ambassador of Ukraine to Poland
On 13 October 2014, President Petro Poroshenko appointed Deshchytsia Ambassador of Ukraine to Poland.

President Volodymyr Zelensky dismissed Deshchytsia as Ukraine's ambassador to Poland on 8 February 2022.

Diplomatic rank
Ambassador Extraordinary and Plenipotentiary of Ukraine.

See also 

 Ministry of Foreign Affairs (Ukraine)
 Embassy of Ukraine, Helsinki

References

External links
Ministry of Foreign Affairs of Ukraine
Engagement and resolve required to achieve concrete results, Co-Chairs of Geneva International Discussions tell OSCE Permanent Council
OSCE Chairperson's Special Representative for conflicts Andrii Deshchytsia arrives in Azerbaijan

1965 births
Living people
People from Lviv Oblast
University of Lviv alumni
University of Alberta alumni
Ambassadors of Ukraine to Finland
Ambassadors of Ukraine to Iceland
Ambassadors of Ukraine to Poland
Foreign ministers of Ukraine